Magnolia is an unincorporated community in Marengo County, Alabama, United States.

Geography

Notable person
 Tommie Agee, former Major League Baseball player, who is known for two of his catches in Game 3 of the 1969 World Series.
 Derek Westmoreland, Reliability Engineer, previous owner of Mask House

References

Unincorporated communities in Alabama
Unincorporated communities in Marengo County, Alabama